A university council may be the executive body of a university's governance system, an advisory body to the university president, or something in between in authority.

In the United Kingdom and many other countries, the council is responsible for all financial matters, the buildings and the appointment of the vice-chancellor. Academic affairs are the business of the university senate. In some cases the senate and council have equal status under the legislation that established the university. In other cases, such as Australia, the senate is technically responsible to the council, although the council is normally reluctant to enter into a discussion on academic issues. The membership of university councils consists of people from outside the university, often appointed by governments, along with some staff and, in some cases, students. The council is chaired by the university chancellor or a pro-chancellor or deputy chancellor.

United Kingdom 

In most pre-1992 universities in the United Kingdom, Council is the governing body. (In post-1992 universities this is the Board of Governors; in the Ancient universities of Scotland this is the Court.) According to the Higher Education Code of Governance, the primary responsibilities of Council include appointing the executive head of the institution (normally titled the vice-chancellor), delegate powers of management to them, and monitor their performance. The council is also the principal financial and business authority and the legal authority of the university, and the members of Council are the trustees of the university, thus Council may sometimes also be known as the Board of Trustees (e.g. the University of Bristol).

Council will normally have an independent chair and (except for Oxford and Cambridge) a majority of "lay" members, not employed by the university. There is also "an expectation" in the Code of Governance that Council will contain representatives of staff and students (often the President of the Student Union) in addition to the lay members and the university's senior management. At some universities there are external ex officio members, reflecting their institutional history (e.g. the Dean of Durham at Durham University).

In the Ancient Universities of Scotland, the General Council is the consultative assembly of the graduates and academic staff, created by the Scottish Universities Act (1858). These are completely different from the governing body Councils of other British universities, being equivalent to the Convocations of the Universities of Oxford and Durham and the Senate of the University of Cambridge.

United States 
In the United States, the university council takes the form of a board of regents or trustees.

University of Pennsylvania 

A different model is provided by the University of Pennsylvania.  Its Bylaws of University Council, revised February 28, 2007, say "The University Council of the University of Pennsylvania is a deliberative and representative forum which exists to consider the activities of the university in all its phases, with particular attention to those matters that affect the common interests of faculty, staff, and students.  It shall recommend general policies and otherwise advise the President, the provost, and officers of the university.  It is authorized to initiate policy proposals as well as to express its judgment on those submitted to it by the administrative officers of the university and its various academic divisions. It is also empowered to request information through appropriate channels from any member of the university administration.

"In its deliberative role, as it undertakes to reach collective decisions on policies initiated or evaluated for recommendations to officers of the University, an important function of the University Council is to transform the interests of its various constituency groups into forms congruent with the interest of the University as a whole. In such a case, a majority decision should be articulated in terms of the University's general welfare and constructed to advance this welfare.  In its representative role, an important function of the University Council is to inform officers of the University--as well as the citizens of the University at-large--of the views and strength of views held by members of the University community.  In this public expression of a heterogeneity of views, without their resolution into an agreement for action, may serve the University Council's advisory purpose authentically, and especially when such a diversity of discourse increases understanding among constituencies in addition to revealing the breadth of considered opinion as a ground for accommodation in subsequent University decision-making....

"Membership on the Council requires a readiness to attend meetings of the Council regularly and to participate fully in its business, including the work of its committees.  It is the continuous obligation of the members of the Council to report to the members of their constituencies about the discussions, the decisions, and recommendations of the Council and to solicit questions and suggestions for presentation to the Council."

The President of the University of Pennsylvania is the presiding officer of the University Council.  The President, or in the absence of the President, the provost, turns the conduct of the meeting over to a moderator, who is a Presidential appointee and a non-voting member of the council. The President also appoints a Parliamentarian, in consultation with the Steering Committee.  The Secretary of the university shall be the Secretary of the Council and the Secretary of the Steering Committee.

Members of the University Council include forty-five members of the executive committee of the Faculty Senate, one full-time lecturer, one full-time member of the research faculty, eleven administrative officers of the university, fifteen graduate and professional students, fifteen undergraduate students, two representatives of the Penn Professional Staff Assembly, one representative of the Librarians Assembly, two representatives of the Weekly-Paid Professional Staff Assembly, and one representative of the United Minorities Council.  All representatives are elected by their respective constituencies except for the eleven administrative officers, who are appointed by the President.

See also

 University of Oxford Council

References

External links
http://www.upenn.edu/secretary/council/bylaws.html

Academic terminology
Councils
University governance